John Forster (died March 1748) was an administrator of the English East India Company. He served as governor of Fort William in Bengal in the eighteenth century. His daughter John Anna Forster  (died 4 June 1774) married Sir Harry Goring, 6th Baronet.

References

Presidents of Bengal
English businesspeople
British East India Company people
18th-century British people
Year of birth missing
1748 deaths